The Mpondomise people, also called AmaMpondomise, are a Xhosa-speaking people. Their traditional homeland has been in the contemporary era Eastern Cape province of South Africa, during apartheid they were located both in the Ciskei and Transkei region. Like other separate Xhosa-speaking kingdoms such as abaThembu and amaMpondo, they speak Xhosa and are at times considered as part of the Xhosa people. 

The AmaMpondomise form part of the AbaseMbo Nguni ethnic groups of South Africa. The formal establishment of the ethnic groups as a separate nation from the other local Bantu peoples or their Nguni cousins is estimated around 13th century. The Mpondomise encountered colonists migrating further inland and eastwards from the Cape of Good Hope.

As a result of colonial conquest, a majority of amaMpondomise speak Xhosa, with a minority who are bilingual speaking Mpondomise as their home language and Xhosa as a second language. Some people view Mpondomise as a dialect of Xhosa. However, the language is dying out.

History

Origins
The name Mpondomise, which means "to hold your horns upright", is a descriptor for the mountainous lands that the ethnic group occupied. It is also to signify the fighting strength of the nation. The Mpondomise originate in traditional Southern Nguni and Mbo lands in south-east Africa and the northern parts of the Western Cape. They presently reside in KwaZulu Natal, the Eastern Cape and the Western Cape. They are part of the Nguni people, being part of the greatest subdivision of the Ngunis i.e. the AbaMbo people. AbaMbo people include some Zulus (Mkhize, Mavovo, Majola etc.), some Tswanas (Bapo), Swatis (particularly Dlaminis from which the monarch of Eswatini comes), Mpondos, Xesibe and AmaBomvu and AmaBomvana descendants of Nomafu. AmaMpondomise did not migrate to Southern Africa because the region forms parts of their land. The Lebombo born that is estimated to be about 35 000 years the oldest mathematical tool in the world, which is similar to the Ishango bone found in the Lebombo border serves as proof that Nguni and AmaMbo are indigenous to Southern Africa.

In abaMbo history and tradition, Mpondomise are seen as wise since the name metaphorically means to be dual in nature or to raise your horn: in other words, to be diplomatic but also be ready to attack (with the literal meaning being "hold your horns upright"). Mpondomise people are the descendants of Mpondomise, the grandson of Sibiside who was the leader of the once-powerful Mbo nation (AbaMbo or MaMbo). It is through king Sibiside's son Njanya (the father of Mpondomise) that the Mpondomise nation emerged together with other Nguni nations or ethnic groups as a force to be reckoned with. It is also through Sibiside (the king and founder of the abaMbo and grandfather of Mpondomise) that Mpondomise people are cousins to other abaMbo people such as AmaMpondo (who was Mpondomise's the twin), AmaXesibe (born after the twins), ooMkhize and ooDlamini (regardless of Nguni affiliation, including those who are so-called "Mfengu").

Since Mpondomise and Mpondo were twins, there is an ongoing argument as to which twin wwas the eldest. The most commonly held view is that Mpondomise is the senior twin. It is said tha,t while out hunting, Mpondo killed a lion and refused to hand over the skin to Mpondomise as was the custom (the senior was entitled to skins of certain animals). The tension between the two started from that day. Mpondo and his followers had to leave and settle elsewhere away from their father's land, as custom dictates that the senior inherits the father's land.

In terms of genealogy of kings, Sibiside begests:
 Njanya (AmaMpondo, AmaMpondomise, AmaXesibe) who is Sibiside's heir 
 Mavovo (father of the Mkhize clan)
 Gubhela (his descendants also call themselves abakwaMkhize)
 Nomafu (whose descendants are known as AmaBomvu and AmaBomvana)

It is worth noting that AmaMpondomise also intermarried with the San people. This can be picked up in their language that has various clicks. Evidence is also found in their clan names. The Mpondomise openly assert themselves as a San woman's descendants (thole loMthwakazi).

Kingdom
After existing as a kingdom for over 600 years, the AmaMpondomise were stripped of their status by the Union of South Africa in 1904 after King Mhlontlo was accused of killing a Qumbu magistrate, Hamilton Hope, and two white police officers during the Mpondomise Revolt in 1880-81. Although Mhlontlo was acquitted of the murder charge, he lost his kingship by administrative action. The AmaMpondomise nation’s hopes were again dashed during the democratic dispensation when the Nhlapo Commission found in 2005 that they had no claim to a kingship. However, a 115-year battle, for this anti-colonial nation, to get their king and kingdom reinstalled and reinstated respectively, ended when the Eastern Cape High Court (Mthatha) officially recognised the AmaMpondomise's kingship. It ordered that the kingship be reinstated. With the presiding judge setting aside the Tolo Commission's decision to oppose the AmaMpondomise’s claim of kingship.

Genealogy of kings
The most prominent of all the kings of the Mpondomise nation was Majola (or Jola). Both royal houses include him in their clan names.

 King Nkosi fathered Zalankomo.
 King Zalankomo fathered Langa. 
 King Langa fathered Sidweba.
 King Sidweba fathered Sibiside. 
 King Sibiside fathered Njanya. 
 King Njanya is the father of the twins Mpondo and Mpondomise.  On the demise of Njanya, the younger twin Mpondo left the Great Place with his aba-Mbo followers and founded the amaMpondo Kingdom, leaving his older twin brother Mpondomise on his father’s throne as the king of the mainline of the aba-Mbo kingship but Mpondomise founded amaMpondomise Kingdom.
 King Mpondomise fathered Ndunu
 King Ndunu fathered Sikhomo.
 King Sikhomo fathered Njanya.
 King Njanya fathered Malangana, who was assisted by his maternal uncle Rudulu led the Aba-Mbo movement from their third settlement in Natal/Swatini, settled near the source of a mysterious river called Dedesi. This is where they resided with AmaXhosa and AbaThembu under the Kings Togu and Hala respectively. AmaMpondo crossed the Mzimkhulu river first and. Njanya’s great son and heir Ntose took over on the demise of Malangana.
 King Ntose fathered Ngcwina
 King Ngcwina fathered Cira and Dosini (who was disinherited)
 King Cira fathered Mte
 King Mte fathered Sabe
 King Sabe father Qengeba 
 King Qengeba  fathered Majola
 King Majola fathered Ngwanya
 King Ngwanya fathered Pahlo
 King Pahlo fathered Sontlo (Mamani kaPhahlo, the eldest daughter of Phahlo, became a queen in her own right and influenced the succession of Sontlo.)
 King Sontlo fathered Mngcambe
 King Mngcambe fathered Myeki
 King Myeki fathered Matiwane (from whom the royal family derives its surname)
 King Matiwane fathered Mhlontlo (who was dispossessed of the kingship status)
 King Mhlontlo fathered Welsh.
 Welsh fathered Sidindi
 Sidindi fathered Loyiso
 Loyiso fathered Luzuko. Luzuko is yet to ascend the throne. His coronation has been delayed by the Dosini royal line's unsuccessfully contest for the succession.

 Dosini’s descedants in terms of the AmaMpondomise Kingship claimants were: Dosini - Nqabashe-Nceleduna - Mqhorana - Hala - Marule - Mxoko - Gxaba - Nyakatya - Sigiwili - Masethi (from whom this royal family derives its surname)- Ntamnani - Myezo - Ntombenkonzo. Ntombenkonzo is the current claimant from this line. She has lost the case in court -see court papers in references

Language
Colonists wrongly identified Mpondomise as Xhosa. Some colonists later identified Mpondomise as a dialect of Xhosa. Consequently, amaMpondomise people had to learn and speak Xhosa fluently to conduct business. Contemporarily, Mpondomise people speak Xhosa as a home language or as a second language in order to conduct business since Mpondomise is not recognised as an official language of the Republic of South Africa. There is a minority, comprising mostly older people, who speak the language. They are concentrated in the far eastern part of the Eastern Cape, primarily in the OR Tambo District Municipality, in the Tsolo and Qumbu villages where the great house and right-hand house reside, respectively. Other languages similar to Mpondomise include Swati, Ndebele and the various Tekela languages of nations such as amaMpondo, AmaHlubi and AmaZizi. 

Amampondomise are learning Xhosa at schools and are required to select Xhosa as their preferred language on official documents such as government forms. Consequently, they are slowly losing their language. This is also evident in that amaMpondomise linguistically identify themselves with their cousins, amaXhosa, as Xhosa speaking people; while retaining a separate ethnic identity as amaMpondomise.

Mpondomise clans and tributary clans
The Mpondomise people comprise various clans. First are clans that arise out of the many houses of the kings. Second are clans of the older AbaMbo nation from which Mpondomise was born out. Therefore clan names are indicative of people's ancestors (or dynasties and cadet branches). Third, there are clans or ethnic groups who have immigrated to the kingdom of the Mpondomise and now pay tribute to the Mpondomise kingdom.

In more detail
 From Bhukwana – ooMbara, Mtshobo, Phaphulengonyama, Into ezingaphathwa mntu ngoba zizinkosi ngokwazo
 From Debeza – OoDebeza, ngoJebe, Nonyanya, Nongoqo, Mbeka Ntshiyini Bathi uqumbile, Khonkcoshe Mbokodo engava mkwetsho 
 From Dosini – ooDosini, Ncele, Ntose, Nqabashe, Ngcelenduna, Mqhorhana, Ngxow'inoboya, uNoyiila, uNogqaz'umthonyama, isihlobo sikaMthimkhulu, sikaBhungane yena mntu ungaphezulu nakuThixo kuba abantu ubanike amabele, Ingqoq'enebal, Ngwanya kaMajola, uMajola inyoka enothando kuba ityelela abafazi endlwini (The royals of the Mpondomise, the right-hand house).  
 From Gxarha – Gxarha -Cwerha, Vambane, Mahlahla, Mlawu, Potwana
 From Jola – SingaMampondomse ngohlanga (i.e. we are ethnically Mpondomise), ooJola, ooJoliNkomo, ooMphaNkomo, ooQengeba, OoNgwanya, Nomakhala, Njuza, S'thukuthezi, sithandwa mhla kukubi, Hoshode, Hakaha, mfaz' obele 'nye omabele made, oncancisa naphesheya komlambo (The royals of the Mpondomise, the great house).  The South African politician, Fikile Mbalula is from this clan.
 From Mpehle – amaMpehle, Vengwa, Dikana, Cabashe, Nohushe
 From Mpinga  – ooMpinga, Mawawa, Mbala kaNkqoshe, Mpondomise, Ntose, Nto'mntwana, Ngwangwashe, uSenzwa, Sineka, Mbetshane, Hlahla lamsik' umntu esendeni, Ngceza, Sintila, Nyaw'zinoshukela, mzukulu kaSityulu, kheth'omthandayo, yazi b'inobaya ifanelwe ngabafana. This is the clan of Enoch Sontonga, the author of "Nkosi Sikelel' iAfrika", part of the National Anthem of Republic of South Africa.
 From Nxasana – NguSikonza, uNxasana, uTotoba, uDunjane, uMalilelwaziintombi zithi ndizeke, adinamama andinatata, uBhili, uMagazo, uLunguza, gastyeketye umbona obomvu othandwa ngabantwana
 From Nxotwe – ooNxotwe, Gabazi, Qamkazi, Mfuza afulele okwelifu lemvula, Mpondomise
 From Nxuba – ooNxuba, Mduma, Rhudulu, Mngcengane
 From Qhinebe – ooQhinebe, Gqugqugqu, Zithonga-zithathu, Haha, Njemnyama, Nondela, Phazima, Mpondomise, Mlunjwa, Phalela, Mkhomanzi, Duka namahlathi, Umth’ omde owavelela eHoyita!
 From Skhoji – (Inzala ka William Saunders wase Scotland)
 From Skhomo – ooUmntu womlambo,Tshangisa, Mhlatyana, Rhudulu, uNxub’ongafiyo ofa ngokuvuthelwa, Mngwevu, Jola, Manz’amnyama, Qengebe, Mhaga
 From Zongozi – ooSenzela ooPhondo liyagexeza (bazalwa nguNtose kaCirha ikumkani yamaMpondomise, hayi lo wamaXhosa)

There are tributary clans such as:
 Mphuthi, Nyathi, Msuthu, uRhahla, Rhabani, Tsiki, Nhose; Oogaxel’umbengo, boya beNyathi, Amathol’enkomo zikaNyathi, abeSuthu, ebePhuth'ephuthini!  Oozishuba zimdakana phesheya komlanjana wegqili, Izilwana zona zehla ezintabeni zokhahlamba ngeziluluthwana, sithetha ngenzala ka Nose (Nhose) kubafazi bakhe abathathu kuMawushe ewe uMatshezi naye uMamhlwane. Esikhoyo isikululwana sesabo OoQhaziyana, OoGeorge kwa noLanga iinkulu zakhe. Ziintsuthu zaseQuthini (Sotho) ngokomlandu kodwa ngenxa yemfuduko zokhokho bafumaneka Eastern Cape kuTsolo kwela maMpondomise eMcwangele [amaMpondomise ngokuma] “Nje ngoko namagama ezixela ziintsuthu ezi ngobuhlanga”
Nyathi uMsuthu, uMphuthi, uRhahla, uRhabani, uTsiki, uNhose; Oogaxel’umbengo, boya beNyathi, Amathol’enkomo zikaNyathi, abeSuthu, ebePhuth'ephuthini! Oozishuba zimdakana phesheya komlanjana wegqili, Izilwana zona zehla ezintabeni ngeziluluthwana, Nje ngoko namagama ezixela ziintsuthu ezi ngobuhlanga” sithetha ngenzala ka Nose (Nhose) kubafazi bakhe abathathu kuMawushe, uMatshezi naye umaMhlwane. Esikhoyo isikululwana sesabo oonyana neenkulu zakhe,uQhaziyana uGeorge kwa noLanga. Ziintsuthu zaseQuthini (Sotho) ngokomlandu kodwa ngenxa yemfuduko/ mfeguza zokhokho bafumaneka Eastern Cape kuTsolo kwela maMpondomise eMcwangele [amaMpondomise ngokuma]

Culture and religion
Among the Mpondomise people, most practise African religions alongside Christianity. African religions encompass ancestral worship (or veneration) and sometimes some Totemism in which a spiritual meaning is attached to some animals and plants, which may be deified. For Mpondomise people this is uMajola (mole snake). This snake is revered and venerated. They believe that it visits a newborn "to prepare it for a successful and safe adult life. It comes as a friend and protector. The friendship it expresses is not anchored in a benign demonstration of goodwill but rather an active expression of solidarity and striving to support and encourage long-term success of the young and growing members of the human race." A visitation from uMajola signifies good fortune. It also means the ancestors are showing their favour on the visited people or family. Killing the snake is believed to have severe physiological and psychological consequences. This last part is central to the plot of the famous Xhosa novel Ingqumbo yeminyanya ("The Wrath of the Ancestors"). The snake is common in South Africa in the provinces where generally abaMbo (and by extension amaMpondomise) mostly reside: KwaZulu-Natal, the Eastern Cape and the Western Cape.

Notable People
 Steve Komphela – South African football manager and a former footballer.
 Fikile Mbalula – South African politician.
 Thulas Nxesi – South African politician.
 Enoch Sontonga – South African composer of the national anthem.
 Mvuyo Tom – South African doctor, administrator and academic.

See also
List of current constituent African monarchs
Mpondo people
Xhosa people
Xhosa clan names

References

Ethnic groups in South Africa